The Murder of Dr. Harrigan is a 1936 American mystery film directed by Frank McDonald and written by Peter Milne and Sy Bartlett. The film stars Ricardo Cortez, Kay Linaker, John Eldredge, Mary Astor, Joseph Crehan and Frank Reicher. The film was released by Warner Bros. on January 11, 1936.
A story by Mignon G. Eberhart was the basis for the film.

Plot
The head of a drug company mysteriously disappeared after taking credit for a new anesthetic that actually resulted from the work of several doctors, and "the doctor who was to have operated on him is found mysteriously murdered by a surgical instrument."

Cast       
 Ricardo Cortez as George Lambert
 Kay Linaker as Sally Keating
 John Eldredge as Dr. Harrigan
 Mary Astor as Lillian Cooper
 Joseph Crehan as Lieut. Lamb
 Frank Reicher as Dr. Coate
 Anita Kerry as Agnes Melady
 Phillip Reed as Dr. Simon
 Robert Strange as Peter Melady
 Mary Treen as Nurse Margaret Brody
 Wild Bill Elliott as Kenneth Martin
 Don Barclay as Jackson
 Johnny Arthur as Mr. Wentworth
 Joan Blair as Ina Harrigan

References

External links 
 
 
 
 

1936 films
Warner Bros. films
American mystery films
1936 mystery films
Films directed by Frank McDonald
American black-and-white films
1930s English-language films
1930s American films
Films scored by Bernhard Kaun
Films about missing people